Albert L. Catlin (c.1809 – August 10, 1884) was an American politician who served as the 1st Mayor of Burlington, Vermont. Catlin was born in Addison County, Vermont around 1809 and died in Burlington in 1884 with no family due to having no children with his wife whom he outlived.

Career
In 1850, he was appointed by the United States Senate as federal customs collector for Vermont. Later in the 1850s he became a director and a member of the board of finance for the National Life Insurance Company of Montpelier, Vermont.

Catlin was one of six Whig presidential electors for the state of Vermont, as the 3rd district elector, during the 1848 presidential campaign and cast his vote for Zachary Taylor when the electoral college met. During the 1864 presidential campaign he supported the National Union ticket and was the one of two at-large presidential electors along with three other district electors and went on to cast his vote for Abraham Lincoln.

Mayoral
On February 20, 1865, Catlin defeated Carolus Noyes for the mayoralty of Burlington in its first election with 413 votes to Noyes' 249 and won both wards and would serve one one-year term. In his mayoral address in 1866, he referred to Burlington as the "Queen City of New England", which it had been called as far back as 1848, leading to the popularization of the nickname.

Later life

In 1866, Catlin nominated state representative John L. Barstow for the Republican nomination for state senate and was approved unanimously.

In 1878, he was one of the charterers of a corporation with the purpose to hold real estate for the Bishop of the Episcopal Church in the Diocese of Vermont.

References

1809 births
1884 deaths
Mayors of Burlington, Vermont
Vermont Republicans
19th-century American politicians